Goma Devkota (Nepali: गोमा देवकोटा) (née Karki) is a Nepali politician and a member of the House of Representatives of the federal parliament of Nepal. She was elected from CPN UML through the proportional representation system, filling the reservation seat for women as well as Khas Arya group.

She was born in Sindhuli to Bhakta Kumari Karki and Jay Bahadur Karki. She studied up to the SLC level. She was married to the communist revolutionary Late. Rishi Devkota (Azad).

References

Living people
Nepal MPs 2017–2022
Nepal Communist Party (NCP) politicians
21st-century Nepalese women politicians
21st-century Nepalese politicians
Members of the National Assembly (Nepal)
Communist Party of Nepal (Unified Marxist–Leninist) politicians
1950 births